Misriadi Didiet (born on January 26, 1989) is an Indonesian footballer who currently plays for Mitra Kukar F.C. in the Indonesia Super League.

References

1989 births
Association football midfielders
Living people
Indonesian footballers
Liga 1 (Indonesia) players
Mitra Kukar players